Roberto Esposito (Piano di Sorrento, 4 August 1950) is an Italian political philosopher, critical theorist, and professor, notable for his academic research and works on biopolitics.<ref>Bird, Greg and Jon Short (2013). "Community, Immunity, and the Proper: An Introduction to the Political Theory of Roberto Esposito". Angelaki 18(3): 1-12. http://www.tandfonline.com/doi/abs/10.1080/0969725X.2013.834661#.UnbD5CRQ3M0</ref> He currently serves as professor of theoretical philosophy at the Scuola Normale Superiore in Pisa.

Biography
Esposito was born in Piano di Sorrento, Italy on 4 August 1950. He graduated at the University of Naples Federico II. He was vice director of the Italian Institute of Human Sciences of Naples, full professor of theoretical philosophy, and the coordinator of the Ph.D. program in philosophy until 2013. For five years he was the only Italian member of the International Council of Scholars of the Collège international de philosophie in Paris.

He was one of the founders of the European Political Lexicon Research Centre and of the International Centre for a European Legal and Political Lexicon, which was established by a consortium made up of the Universities of Bologna, Florence, Padua, Salerno, Naples "L'Orientale", and Naples S. Orsola Benincasa. He is co-editor of the book series Filosofia Politica published by il Mulino, the series Per la Storia della Filosofia Politica published by Franco Angeli, the series Storia e teoria politica published by Bibliopolis, and the series Comunità e Libertà published by Laterza. He is editor of the series Teoria e Oggetti published by Liguori and also acts as a philosophy consultant for the publishing house Einaudi.

His 2012 monograph, Living Thought. The Origins and Actuality of Italian Philosophy (trans. Zakiya Hanafi, Stanford University Press, 2012), is dedicated to the Italian philosophical thought, and aims at creating a historical and theoretical background for the definition of the notion of "Italian Theory". He has been featured in the Summer 2006 and Fall 2009 issues of the journal Diacritics and the Fall 2013 special issue of the journal Angelaki.

Bibliography
 Vico e Rousseau e il moderno Stato borghese, De Donato, 1976.
 Ideologie della neo-avanguardia, Liguori, 1976.
 Il sistema dell’indifferenza: Moravia e il fascismo, Dedalo, 1978.
 La politica e la storia. Machiavelli e Vico, Liguori, 1980.
 Divenire della ragione moderna. Cartesio, Spinoza, Vico, co-authored with Biagio De Giovanni and Giuseppe Zarone, Liguori, 1981.
 Ordine e conflitto. Machiavelli e la letteratura politica del Rinascimento italiano, Liguori, 1984.
 Categorie dell’impolitico, Il Mulino, 1988; new edition 1999.
 Nove pensieri sulla politica, Il Mulino, 1993.
 L’origine della politica. Hannah Arendt o Simone Weil?, Donzelli, 1996.
 Lo specchio del reame. Riflessioni su potere e comunicazione, Longo Angelo, 1997.
 Communitas. Origine e destino della comunità, Einaudi, 1998; new edition 2006. English version: Communitas: The Origin and Destiny of Community, trans. Timothy Campbell, Stanford University Press, 2004. 
 Immunitas. Protezione e negazione della vita, Einaudi, Torino, 2002. English version: Immunitas. The Protection and Negation of Life, trans. Zakiya Hanafi, Polity Press, 2011.
 Bios. Biopolitica e filosofia, Einaudi, 2004. English version: Bìos: Biopolitics and Philosophy, Trans. Timothy Campbell, Minnesota University Press, 2008. 
 "The Immunization Paradigm," in Special Issue: Bios, Immunity, Life: The Thought of Roberto Esposito, edited by Timothy Campbell, Diacritics - Volume 36, Number 2, Summer 2006, pp. 2–22 The Johns Hopkins University Press. 
 Terza persona. Politica della vita e filosofia dell'impersonale, Einaudi, Torino, 2007; English version: Third Person. Politics of Life and Philosophy of the Impersonal, trans. Zakiya Hanafi, Polity Press, 2012.
 Termini della Politica. Communità, immunitià, biopolitica, Mimesis, 2008. English version: Terms of the Political: Community, Immunity, Biopolitics, trans. Rhiannon Noel Welch, Fordham University Press, 2012.
 "Pensiero vivente. Origine e attualità della filosofia italiana", Einaudi, 2010. English version: Living Thought. The Origins and Actuality of Italian Philosophy, trans. Zakiya Hanafi, Stanford University Press, 2012.
 "Politics and Human Nature", in Bio-economy, Christianity, Human Nature, special issue of Angelaki: journal of the theoretical humanities, volume 16 number 3, September 2011, Routledge.
 "Community, Immunity, Biopolitics”, in Greg Bird and Jon Short (eds.), Roberto Esposito, Community, and the Proper, Special Issue: Angelaki, Volume 18, Number 3, 2013, pp. 83-90.
 Persons and Things: From the Body's Point of View, trans. Zakiya Hanafi, Polity Books, forthcoming 2015.
 Due. La macchina della teologia politica e il posto del pensiero, Einaudi 2013. English version: Two. The machine of political theology and the place of thought, trans. Zakiya Hanafi, Fordham University Press, forthcoming 2015.

Works in English
 Communitas: the Origin and Destiny of Community, trans. Timothy Campbell, Stanford University Press, 2004.
 "The Immunization Paradigm," in Special Issue: Bios, Immunity, Life: The Thought of Roberto Esposito, trans./edited by Timothy Campbell, Diacritics - Volume 36, Number 2, Summer 2006, pp. 2–22 The Johns Hopkins University Press.
 Immunitas. The Protection and Negation of Life, trans. Zakiya Hanafi, Polity Press, 2011.
 Bìos: Biopolitics and Philosophy, Trans. Timothy Campbell, Minnesota University Press, 2008. 
 Third Person. Politics of Life and Philosophy of the Impersonal, trans. Zakiya Hanafi, Polity Press, 2012.
 Terms of the Political: Community, Immunity, Biopolitics, trans. Rhiannon Noel Welch, Fordham University Press, 2012.
 Living Thought. The Origins and Actuality of Italian Philosophy, trans. Zakiya Hanafi, Stanford University Press, 2012.
 * "Politics and Human Nature," in Bio-economy, Christianity, Human Nature, Special Issue: Angelaki: journal of the theoretical humanities, volume 16 number 3, September 2011, Routledge.
 "Community, Immunity, Biopolitics,” in Greg Bird and Jon Short (eds.), Roberto Esposito, Community, and the Proper, Special Issue: Angelaki, Volume 18, Number 3, 2013, pp. 83-90.
 Persons and Things: From the Body's Point of View, trans. Zakiya Hanafi, Polity Books, forthcoming 2015.
 Two. The machine of political theology and the place of thought'', trans. Zakiya Hanafi, Fordham University Press, forthcoming 2015.

Notes

References
Roberto Esposito - Istituto Italiano di Scienze Umane

External links
 Bibliography of the writings of Roberto Esposito (1976-2019) – edited by C. Claverini
 Interpreting the 20th Century: Totalitarianism or Biopolitics?  Barcelona Metropolis 2008.
 Roberto Esposito: from the Impolitical to the Impersonal by Matías Leandro Saidel  Barcelona Metropolis 2011.
 Roberto Esposito, Community, and the Proper Special Issue of Angelaki. Edited by Greg Bird and Jon Short. Angelaki 18(3), 2013.

1950 births
20th-century Italian educators
20th-century Italian male writers
20th-century Italian philosophers
21st-century Italian educators
21st-century Italian male writers
21st-century Italian philosophers
Biopolitics
Critical theorists
Italian expatriates in France
Italian political philosophers
Italian political writers
Living people
Philosophy academics
Academic staff of the Scuola Normale Superiore di Pisa
Academic staff of the Università degli Studi di Napoli "L'Orientale"
Academic staff of the University of Bologna
Academic staff of the University of Florence
University of Naples Federico II alumni
Academic staff of the University of Padua
Academic staff of the University of Salerno
Writers from Campania